Glenea menesioides is a species of beetle in the family Cerambycidae. It was described by Stephan von Breuning in 1969. It is known from Borneo.

References

menesioides
Beetles described in 1969